Paul Michael Larson (May 10, 1949 – February 16, 1999) was an American television game show contestant from Ohio who appeared on the CBS program Press Your Luck in 1984. Larson is notable for winning US$110,237 in cash and prizes, at the time the largest one-day total ever won on a game show. He was able to win by memorizing the patterns used on the Press Your Luck game board.

Larson used his cash winnings to pay taxes and invested most of the rest in bad real estate deals. As a result, he lost all of his winnings within two years of the show's taping. He later fled Ohio while under investigation for fraud. He was found to be living in Florida when he died of throat cancer at the age of 49. Since his death in 1999, Larson's game has re-aired on television at various times and inspired two Game Show Network documentaries: Big Bucks: The Press Your Luck Scandal in 2003 and Cover Story: The Press Your Luck Scandal in 2018.

Early life
One of four brothers, Larson was born in Lebanon, Ohio. After getting married and divorced twice while very young, by 1983, Larson had a common law marriage with Teresa McGlynn Dinwitty. Two of their three children were named Jennifer, for whom Michael used his winnings to buy birthday presents, and Paul Michael Larson Jr. One of his brothers, James, a chemistry teacher, and his wife Dinwitty considered him strange, as he thought he was smarter than everybody else.

For several years, Larson was a Mister Softee ice cream truck driver as well as an air conditioning mechanic. While he was often regarded as creative and intelligent, Larson had a preference for shady enterprises over gainful employment. In middle school, he would often smuggle candy bars into class and try to secretly sell them to make a profit. Another scheme involved opening multiple checking accounts with a bank that was offering a promotional $500 to every new customer. Larson would withdraw the money as quickly as possible, close the account, then repeat the process again under a different name. Larson also started a fake business under the name of one of his family members and hired himself to work for the company. He then laid himself off in order to earn unemployment benefits.

Press Your Luck

Preparations

Larson used his VCR to record episodes of Press Your Luck shortly after its premiere on CBS in September 1983. While watching, he noticed that the randomizer that moved the light indicator around the eighteen-square "Big Board" had only five patterns. Larson began memorizing these patterns, increasingly confident he could predict when and where the randomizer would land. He began playing along with the "Big Board" rounds to test his hypothesis and paused his VHS tape at various intervals.

Larson also discovered that the fourth and eighth squares (from number one in the top left corner then clockwise around the board) always contained cash and never a "Whammy!", a bandit-like cartoon character that, when landed on, would result in the resetting of the player's score to zero, accompanied by an on-screen animation that showed the Whammy taking the player's earnings (with four of them eliminating a player from the game). Larson also learned that the fourth square clockwise always contained the top dollar values and that in round two, contestants were awarded an additional spin if landing on those spots ($3,000, $4,000, or $5,000 in square four, and $500, $750, or $1,000 in square eight). This proved crucial to Larson's theory, as he could retain control of the board in the second round indefinitely if he kept following the patterns.

In May 1984, Larson used most of his savings to fly to Los Angeles, California, to audition for Press Your Luck at CBS Television City, where the show was taped. Contestant supervisor Bobby Edwards was suspicious of Larson's motives when he interviewed Larson on May 19, and was unwilling to allow him on the show, but executive producer Bill Carruthers viewed Larson's claim to be a "small-town plebeian desperately in need of a chance to win some money" as a good sob story for the show, and overruled Edwards. Carruthers would later regret this move. Larson was added as a contestant on the fourth episode of the taping session, scheduled to air on Friday, June 8, 1984.

While waiting in the green room, Larson met Ed Long, a Baptist minister from California booked for the third episode of the session, and struck up a conversation. Long recalled that Larson asked him how many times he had seen the show. When Long replied he had seen it only once, Larson responded by looking at him as though he "were from another planet." Larson told Long, "I really hope we don't have to play each other," before leaving the green room, but they would in fact face off as Long won his match and a total of $11,516 in cash and prizes. The two men competed against dental assistant Janie Litras in the next episode of the session.

The game

First round
As customary, the game began with the first of two rounds in which contestants answered questions to earn spins for the "Big Board"; a correct buzz-in answer earned three spins, while a correct multiple-choice answer earned one spin. Larson's memorization of the patterns could not help him here, and he struggled early. On the second question, the host asked, "You've probably got President Franklin D. Roosevelt in your pocket or purse right now, because his likeness is on the head side..." Larson buzzed in at this point and answered, "$50 bill" (which has a portrait of President Ulysses S. Grant), after which host Peter Tomarken finished the question "...of what American coin?" with the answer being "a dime", the other choice being "a nickel" (which has a portrait of President Thomas Jefferson). He did not buzz in again, answering the last two questions multiple choice and finishing with three spins, behind Long's four and Litras's ten. With the fewest spins, Larson went first. On his first spin, he hit a Whammy; however, on his next two, he hit square #4 twice for $1,250 and finished the round with $2,500. Long and Litras finished the round without a Whammy and won $4,080 and $4,608, respectively, putting Larson in last place.

Second round
Larson buzzed in correctly for two of the four questions, and earned a total of seven spins in the second question round, ahead of Litras's three and Long's two. Since he was in third place, he got to play first at the "Big Board" and went to his pattern play, aiming for squares #4 and #8. Larson quickly bumped his total to over $10,000. Early on, his pattern play was irregular, as he stopped four times on squares that did not follow his pattern: a trip to Kauai worth $1,636 in square #7 (aiming for $3,000 + spin in square #4), $700 and one spin in square #17 (aiming for $750 + one spin in square #8), "Pick a Corner" in square #6 (where he was given the choice of $2,250 in square #1, $2,000 in square #10, or $1,500 and one spin in square #15; he chose $2,250) (aiming again for $750 + one spin in square #8), and a sailboat worth $1,015 in square #7 (aiming for $3,000 + spin in square #4).

After the sailboat, Larson's pattern play became more accurate, as he hit his target squares each time he spun. Tomarken was increasingly astounded that Larson was still spinning despite not having seen a Whammy for so long. Larson continued to press on, passing more and more milestone markers without losing any of his four remaining spins. The episode was taped into two parts since Larson kept pressing. As he passed the $40,000, $50,000, and $60,000 marks, Tomarken virtually begged Larson to stop more than once, fearing he would hit a Whammy. Larson intended to keep spinning until he had reached $100,000. Larson finally decided to stop once he reached $102,851. He had by this time made 40 spins on the board without hitting a Whammy, of which 37 were for  those 37 cash spins he hit square #4 a total of twenty times, including a run of six in a row, and square #8 a total of fifteen times, including two runs of three in a row. After he announced he was passing his remaining four spins, Larson raised his arms in triumph and received a standing ovation from the audience.

By rule, Larson's spins went to Litras as she had the next highest money total. However, since she was the leader after the first round, she had to wait to play until Long, who earned two spins in the second round of questions, completed his turn. On the first of his two spins, a bewildered Long hit a Whammy and lost the money he earned in the first round, leading Tomarken to wonder aloud if Larson "knew that the Whammy was coming." Long hit $5,000 and a spin on his next spin and did it again on the spin after that, but hit a second Whammy with his final spin.

Litras then took her turn, starting with the first of the four spins Larson had passed that she was required to take by rule. On that spin, she hit a Whammy and lost her first round total. However, since she had Whammied, the remaining passed spins were moved into the earned column and added to the three spins Litras earned in the second question round, giving her a total of six spins. Litras picked up $9,385 in cash and prizes in five total spins, but because she managed to hit spaces with extra spins, she used only three. Litras then passed those spins to Larson, who was visibly upset and said, "I didn't want 'em," as he received the three spins.

Nonetheless, Larson picked up where he had left off, following his patterns, and hit his marks with his first two spins. He hit square #17 on his last spin, which was the same space where Larson hit a Whammy on his first spin, but he stopped the board before the Whammy could shuffle into the square and won a trip to the Bahamas valued at $2,636, causing Tomarken to joke, "With that money, you could buy The Bahamas, Michael!" This brought Larson's total to $110,237, and he had two earned spins to work with. Larson passed them to Litras, who failed to earn any additional spins with them, and despite winning extra money on them could not come anywhere near Larson's grand total, thus ending the game. Larson's final total included $5,287 in prizes and $104,950 in cash.

At the end of the episode, Tomarken asked Larson why he decided not to pass his remaining spins before he did, considering the lead he rapidly gained over Litras and Long. Side-stepping revealing how he had won the game, Larson responded with, "Two things: one, it felt right, and second, I still had seven spins and if I passed them, somebody could've done what I did."

Episode length
Each episode of Press Your Luck was thirty minutes in length, and prior to Larson's appearance, the series had never needed to straddle games or stop during play as a match would always be completed within the allotted time frame. However, Larson's streak of hitting his marks every time stretched the length of the episode well past the usual thirty minutes and the producers were unsure how to proceed. While the entire episode was recorded in one shot, the production staff decided that it would need to be split up for airing.

Once Larson racked up $36,851 ($34,200 in cash, $2,651 in prizes) in 15 spins, the producers cut to a freeze frame of the contestant area and Tomarken (in a chroma key shot) then tossed to a commercial. Once back from the commercial, Tomarken informed the viewers that because of the extraordinary circumstances, the match could not be completed on the June 8 episode and would instead be finished on the next scheduled airing on Monday, June 11. He then signed off with the words "To be continued..." superimposed on the screen.

When Press Your Luck returned after the weekend break, the episode started with the same freeze frame image. Tomarken (again chroma keyed over the image) then brought the viewers up to speed on what Friday's episode entailed, first by introducing Larson's opponents and then introducing Larson and explaining what he had done so far, before the game resumed. Freeze frames, with voiceovers by Tomarken, were also used to lead into and out of the first three commercial breaks when Larson eclipsed the $50,000 and $100,000 marks, and when Litras later passed her spins to Larson.

Accusations of cheating
While Larson was running up the score, the show's producers contacted Michael Brockman, then head of CBS's daytime programming department. In a 1994 TV Guide interview commemorating the Larson sweep, conducted at the time the film Quiz Show was released, he recalled, "Something was very wrong. Here was this guy from nowhere, and he was hitting the bonus box every time. It was bedlam, I can tell you, and we couldn't stop this guy. He kept going around the board and hitting that box."

The program's producers and Brockman met to review the videotape. They noticed that Larson would immediately celebrate after many of his spins instead of waiting the fraction of a second it would take for a contestant to see and respond to the space they had stopped on, effectively showing he knew he was going to get something good. It was also noticed that Larson had an unusual reaction to his early prize of a Kauai trip, which was out of his pattern – he initially looked puzzled and upset, but then recovered and celebrated after a pause.

At first, CBS refused to pay Larson, considering him a cheater. However, Brockman and the producers could not find a clause in the game's rules with which to disqualify him (largely because the board had been constructed with these patterns from the beginning of the series) and the network complied. Because he had surpassed the CBS winnings cap (at the time) of $25,000, Larson was not allowed to return for the next show.

The five original light patterns on the "Big Board" were replaced with five new ones for about a month, and those were replaced with a different set of five new patterns for another month. A further reprogramming of the board with 32 patterns was completed in August 1984, effectively ensuring that no one could duplicate Larson's trick; all subsequent versions employ this method.

Episode broadcasts and documentaries
After the broadcast of Larson's two episodes, CBS suppressed the episodes for nineteen years, as both the network and Carruthers considered the incident to be one of their biggest embarrassments. When USA Network bought the rights to rerun Press Your Luck, CBS and Carruthers insisted that the Larson episodes must not be aired.

On March 16, 2003, GSN was allowed to air the episodes as part of a two-hour documentary called Big Bucks: The Press Your Luck Scandal, hosted and narrated by Tomarken. The documentary was produced by and aired on GSN (in association with Lionsgate and RTL Group, the latter of which now owns the Press Your Luck franchise), and broke all previous viewership records for the network. The Big Bucks documentary included additional footage, directly from the original master tapes, that had been edited out of the episodes for their initial broadcast. The original telecast was dedicated to the memory of Carruthers, who had died two weeks before the airing.

As part of the commemoration, Larson's opponents from 1984 were invited back to be contestants on Whammy! The All-New Press Your Luck. Larson had died by this time - his brother, James, was invited to take his place. Tomarken also returned to host the question round. Despite the fact that the board was now fully random (host Todd Newton called it "Larson-proof"), and there was no way the same trick could have been performed, Long and Litras (who had remarried and taken the surname Litras-Dakan) still lost. When James hit the "Big Bank" space on his first spin of the first round, Long proceeded to joke with Newton that he had "seen this before". At one point, Litras-Dakan advanced to first place before hitting a Double Whammy shortly afterward, effectively giving James the win. Long, who was in last place, was the last to spin and racked up some winnings, but not enough to catch up to James, who had won a digital grand piano worth $6,695, while Newton closed the game by announcing, "The legacy continues."

Larson's performance on Press Your Luck was featured in a July 2010 broadcast of This American Life. On January 14, 2018, GSN aired a second documentary on the Larson story entitled Cover Story: The Press Your Luck Scandal. The debut airing earned 583,000 viewers. The Larson episodes themselves aired after the Cover Story documentary. Both of Larson's episodes were edited together into one video and uploaded onto the Buzzr YouTube channel on July 17, 2019.

Adaptations 
A biographical feature film was planned in 2000 in which Bill Murray would portray Larson, but was never produced. In 2017, Spanish author Javi de Castro published a graphic novel about the scandal, titled Larson: el hombre con más suerte del mundo (Larson: The Luckiest Man in the World). Magician Brian Brushwood adapted Larson's endeavors for a 2022 episode of his podcast World's Greatest Con.

Later life, death, and legacy
After Press Your Luck, Larson became an assistant manager at local Walmart stores in Lebanon, Dayton, Xenia and Bellbrook, Ohio. He also ran a promotions and marketing company, Group Dynamics Downline, out of his Lebanon home.

In November 1984, Larson learned about a local radio show promotion promising a $30,000 prize for matching a $1 bill's serial number with a random number read out on the air. Over several days, he withdrew his remaining winnings in $1 bills, examined each dollar, and (upon discovering that he did not have the winning number) re-deposited roughly half of the money. Larson left about $50,000 in his house, which was stolen in a burglary while he was attending a Christmas party. Larson told TV Guide in 1994 that after the burglary, he called on the producers of Press Your Luck to stage a "tournament of champions" for a chance to score big again. The producers declined; the show would end in September 1986.

In 1994, the release of the film Quiz Show renewed discussion about game show scandals, and Larson was interviewed on ABC's Good Morning America. By this time, he had been diagnosed with throat cancer and his voice was noticeably weakened.

Larson ultimately never saw the return of his winnings and failed at several get-rich-quick schemes. In 1995 he engaged in an internet fraud scheme run by a company called Pleasure Time, Inc, which raised $1.8 million from 14,000 investors for a non-existent American-Indian lottery. After the Securities and Exchange Commission filed charges against the operation, Larson fled Ohio and moved to Apopka, Florida, where he died of cancer in 1999 before he could be found and prosecuted.

Larson's daytime network game show winnings record stood until 2006, when Vickyann Chrobak-Sadowski won $147,517 in cash and prizes on the Season 35 premiere of The Price Is Right. However, it was not enough to surpass Larson's inflation-adjusted record ($110,237 was ).

See also
 1950s quiz show scandals
 Charles Ingram

References

Further reading
 Man Cheats on Air, Becomes Biggest Winner Ever | Tales from the Bottle by Qxir

External links
 
 

1949 births
1999 deaths
American fraudsters
Contestants on American game shows
Deaths from cancer in Florida
Deaths from esophageal cancer
Deaths from throat cancer
People from Lebanon, Ohio
People from Apopka, Florida
Walmart people